Apionichthys nattereri is a species of sole in the family Achiridae. It was described by Franz Steindachner in 1876, originally under the genus Solea. It inhabits the Amazon River.

Due to a lack of known major threats to the species, A. nattereri is currently ranked as Least Concern by the IUCN redlist.

References

Pleuronectiformes
Fish described in 1876